Rafiki Saïd Ahamada (born 15 March 2000) is a Comorian professional footballer who plays as a winger for French  club Nîmes.

Club career
Saïd joined the youth academy of Brest at the age of 11, and signed his first professional contract on 25 May 2000. He began his senior career with their reserve side, before joining Stade Briochin on loan for the second half of the 2020–21 season in the Championnat National. He returned to Brest in the summer of 2021, where he was promoted to the senior team. He made his professional debut with Brest in a 1–1 Ligue 1 tie with Angers on 12 September 2021.

On 31 August 2022, Saïd signed with Nîmes for one season, with an option to extend for two more seasons.

References

External links
 

2000 births
Living people
People from Grande Comore
Comorian footballers
Association football wingers
Stade Brestois 29 players
Stade Briochin players
Nîmes Olympique players
Ligue 1 players
Championnat National players
Championnat National 3 players
Comorian expatriate footballers
Comorian expatriates in France
Comorian expatriate sportspeople in France